Field Marshal Richard Frederick Vincent, Baron Vincent of Coleshill,  (23 August 1931 – 8 September 2018) was a British Army officer. After serving with British Army of the Rhine he served with the Commonwealth Brigade in Malaysia during the Indonesia–Malaysia confrontation. He commanded 12th Light Air Defence Regiment in Northern Ireland during the Troubles, for which he was awarded the Distinguished Service Order, and later commanded 19th Airportable Brigade. Although he never served as one of the individual service heads, he went on to be Vice-Chief of the Defence Staff in the late 1980s and then Chief of the Defence Staff in the aftermath of the Gulf War. He subsequently became Chair of the Military Committee of NATO in the mid-1990s.

Military career
Vincent was born in Uxbridge, the son of Frederick Vincent and Francis Elizabeth Vincent (née Coleshill). He was educated at Aldenham School in Hertfordshire. Vincent joined the British Army, initially in the ranks, but after attending Mons Officer Cadet School, he was commissioned as a National Service officer with the rank of second lieutenant in the Royal Artillery on 7 July 1951. He served with the British Army of the Rhine for the first few years, securing a short service commission in the Regular Army on 16 February 1953. Promoted to lieutenant on 13 March 1953 and to captain on 23 August 1958, he became a gunnery staff officer in 1959. He was seconded to the Radar Research Establishment in Malvern in 1960 and returned to the British Army of the Rhine as a troop commander in 1962. He attended the technical staff course at the Royal Military College of Science at Shrivenham in 1963 and attended Staff College, Camberley in 1965, following which he was promoted to major on 23 August 1965 and deployed with the Commonwealth Brigade to Malaysia during the Indonesia–Malaysia confrontation.

Vincent was appointed to a staff officer role at Department of the Master-General of the Ordnance at the Ministry of Defence in 1968 after which he became commanding officer of the 12th Light Air Defence Regiment on 27 February 1970 with promotion to lieutenant colonel on 30 June 1970. He commanded the Regiment in Germany and in Northern Ireland during the Troubles for which he was awarded the Distinguished Service Order. He returned to Camberley as an instructor there in August 1972 and then attended the Administrative Staff College at Henley late in 1973.

Vincent obviously found his niche in the academic area of military life, as he became Military Director of Studies at the Royal Military College of Science in January 1974. Promoted to colonel on 30 June 1974 and to brigadier on 30 June 1975, he became commander of 19th Airportable Brigade in December 1975 and then attended the Royal College of Defence Studies in Belgrave Square, London in 1978. He became Deputy Military Secretary at the Ministry of Defence in January 1979 and following promotion to major general on 1 April 1980, he became Commandant of the Royal Military College of Science in July 1980. He was appointed promoted to lieutenant general on appointment as Master-General of the Ordnance at the Ministry of Defence on 1 September 1983. He was appointed a Knight Commander of the Order of the Bath in the 1984 New Year Honours. Promoted to full general on 3 November 1986, he went on to be Vice-Chief of the Defence Staff in October 1987. He was advanced to Knight Grand Cross of the Order of the British Empire in the 1990 New Year Honours.

Vincent was promoted to field marshal and became Chief of the Defence Staff on 2 April 1991 in the aftermath of the Gulf War. His final appointment was as Chairman of the NATO Military Committee in October 1993, before retiring from the British Army in 1996. He was also Colonel Commandant of the Royal Electrical and Mechanical Engineers (REME) from 1981 until 1987, Colonel Commandant of the Royal Artillery from 1983 until 2000, Colonel Commandant of the Royal Horse Artillery from 1996 until the his death in 2018 and Honorary Colonel of 100th (Yeomanry) Regiment Royal Artillery from 1982 until 1991.

Later career
In retirement Vincent became Chairman of Hunting Defence Limited and a Non-Executive Director of Vickers Defence Systems Limited. He was ennobled in the 1996 Birthday Honours, being created life peer on 3 September 1996 with the title Baron Vincent of Coleshill, of Shrivenham in the County of Oxfordshire, and he held the ceremonial role of Master Gunner, St. James's Park from 1996 until 2000. He retired from the House of Lords on 9 March 2016.

Vincent was Chancellor of Cranfield University, with which the Defence College of Management and Technology had an academic partnership, from 1998 to 2010. His interests included looking after his seven grandchildren. He died on 8 September 2018.

Personal life
In 1955 he married Jean Paterson Stewart (d.2019) : they went on to have two sons (one of whom died young) and a daughter.

Arms

References

Sources

|-

|-
 

|-
 

|-

|-

1931 births
2018 deaths
People from Uxbridge
Graduates of the Royal College of Defence Studies
British field marshals
British military personnel of the Indonesia–Malaysia confrontation
British military personnel of The Troubles (Northern Ireland)
Chiefs of the Defence Staff (United Kingdom)
Companions of the Distinguished Service Order
Crossbench life peers
Foreign recipients of the Legion of Merit
Graduates of the Mons Officer Cadet School
Graduates of the Staff College, Camberley
Knights Commander of the Order of the Bath
Knights Grand Cross of the Order of the British Empire
NATO military personnel
People associated with Cranfield University
People educated at Aldenham School
Royal Artillery officers
Military personnel from Middlesex
Life peers created by Elizabeth II